Juana de la Caridad "Juanita" Castro Ruz (born 6 May 1933) is a Cuban activist as well as the sister of Fidel and Raúl, both former presidents of Cuba, and Ramón, key figure of the Cuban Revolution. After collaborating with the Central Intelligence Agency in Cuba, she has lived in the United States since 1964.

Early life
Juanita was born in Birán, near Mayarí, in what is now known as Holguín Province. She is the fourth child of Ángel Castro y Argiz and Lina Ruz González, and has three brothers — Ramón, Fidel, and Raúl — and three sisters — Angelita, Emma, and Agustina.   Lina Ruz Gonzalez was Angel Castro's cook; he was married to another woman when Juanita and her older brothers were born. She also has five half-siblings: Lidia, Pedro Emilio, Manuel, Antonia, and Georgina, who were raised by Ángel Castro's first wife Maria Luisa Argota, as well as another half-brother, Martin, from her father’s relationship with a farmhand

Politics
Juanita Castro was active in the Cuban revolution, buying weapons for the 26th of July movement during their campaign against Fulgencio Batista. In 1958 she traveled to the U.S. to raise funds to support the insurgent movement. After the revolution Juanita felt betrayed by the growing influence of Cuban communists in the Cuban government.

Fidel and Raúl's government policies clashed with family interests. When the two revolutionaries insisted on including the family plantation in their agrarian reform program to limit private land ownership, their older brother Ramón, who had been maintaining the property, angrily exploded, "Raúl is a dirty little Communist. Some day I am going to kill him."

In this climate, Juanita Castro started collaborating with, and receiving paychecks from, the Central Intelligence Agency (CIA) after being recruited by someone close to her brother Fidel. She later reported that the CIA "wanted to talk to me because they had interesting things to tell me, and interesting things to ask me, such as if I was willing to take the risk, if I was ready to listen to them... I was rather shocked, but anyway I said yes". As part of her work with the CIA, she was credited with helping at least 200 people leave Cuba in the immediate post-revolutionary period. Time magazine reported that "after the mother Lina Ruz died in 1963, there was a violent episode when Fidel decided to expropriate the family land once and for all. Juanita started selling the cattle; Fidel flew into a rage, denounced her as a 'counterrevolutionary worm,' and rushed to the [family's] farm."

Emigration
In 1964 she left Cuba for Mexico, staying with her sister Enma, who had married a Mexican in Cuba and emigrated there. Upon her arrival she called a press conference and announced that she had defected from Cuba. "I cannot longer remain indifferent to what is happening in my country," she said. "My brothers Fidel and Raúl have made it an enormous prison surrounded by water. The people are nailed to a cross of torment imposed by international Communism."

In 1998, she filed a lawsuit in Spain against her niece Alina Fernández, the illegitimate daughter of her brother Fidel Castro, claiming that she had been libeled in some passages in Fernández's autobiography, Castro's Daughter: An Exile's Memoir of Cuba (1998). She claimed the book defamed her family: "People who were eating off Fidel's plate yesterday come here and want money and power, so they say whatever they want, even if it's not true." A Spanish court ordered Fernández and her publisher, Plaza & Janes, a Barcelona-based division of Random House, to pay $45,000 to Juanita Castro.

On 25 October 2009, Juanita Castro told Univision's WLTV-23 she had initially supported her brother's 1959 overthrow of the Batista dictatorship but quickly became disillusioned. Her home became a sanctuary for anti-Communists before she fled the island. In the interview, Juanita Castro said she was approached by the CIA.

Later life
After settling in Miami in 1964, she opened a pharmacy called Mini Price in 1973. She became a naturalized U.S. citizen in 1984. In December 2006 she sold her pharmacy business to CVS Pharmacy.

She published her autobiography in Spanish in 2009 as Fidel y Raul, mis hermanos. La historia secreta (Fidel and Raúl, My Brothers: The Secret History). It was co-written with Mexican journalist María Antonieta Collins.

References

Further reading

External links

 (has link to 6 min 42 sec audio)

1933 births
Living people
People from Mayarí
Juanita
Cuban people of Galician descent
Cuban people of Canarian descent
Cuban emigrants to the United States
Exiles of the Cuban Revolution in Mexico
Opposition to Fidel Castro
Cuban anti-communists
American spies
People from Miami
Exiles of the Cuban Revolution in the United States
Naturalized citizens of the United States